Ending It was a 1939 BBC TV one-off play, written by Val Gielgud, and starring John Robinson, Joan Marion, and Dino Galvani. It was 30 minutes in duration. It was broadcast live on 25 August 1939.

1957 Australian Adaptation

The most unusual aspect of the production was that it was later remade for Australian television in 1957 at a time when Australian drama production was rare. It was directed by William Sterling.

Broadcast live on Sydney station ABN-2 on 19 June 1957, a kinescope was made of the broadcast and shown on Melbourne television station ABV-2 on 19 July 1957. It is not known if the kinescope recording still exists.

Cast
Bruce Beeby
Madi Hedd
Keith Buckley

Production
Bruce Beeby and Madi Hedd were married in real life. They made this shortly after returning to Australia from six years in Britain.

Thelma Afford did the design.

See also
Tomorrow's Child - 1957 Australian television play. 
The Passionate Pianist - 1957 Australian television play.
Box for One - 1958 Australian play, based on a 1949 BBC television play.
List of live television plays broadcast on Australian Broadcasting Corporation (1950s)

References

External links
1939 BBC version at IMDb
1957 Australian version at IMDb

Lost BBC episodes
BBC Television shows
1957 television films
Australian drama television films
Australian Broadcasting Corporation original programming
English-language television shows
Black-and-white Australian television shows
Black-and-white British television shows
British live television shows
1939 television plays
Films directed by William Sterling (director)